The Men's keirin at the European Track Championships was first competed in 2010 in Poland.

The Keirin consists of heats in which the first two or three riders advance until the final.

Medalists

References

2010 Results
2011 Results
2012 Results

 
Men's keirin
Men's keirin